Wainui Beach is a small settlement on the coast of New Zealand's North Island, located just to the north of Tuaheni Point, some 8 km to the east of Gisborne, to which it is linked by State Highway 35.

The beach is one of the NZ Automobile Association's 101 Must-do places for Kiwis. It is noted for its consistent surf breaks.
Wainui Beach's most notable residents have been the Quinn family, which contains three national champion surfers - brothers Maz and Jay, and sister Holly.

Demographics
Wainui Beach is in five SA1 statistical areas which cover . The SA1 areas are part of the Wainui-Okitu statistical area.

Wainui Beach had a population of 819 at the 2018 New Zealand census, an increase of 99 people (13.8%) since the 2013 census, and an increase of 147 people (21.9%) since the 2006 census. There were 288 households, comprising 399 males and 414 females, giving a sex ratio of 0.96 males per female, with 201 people (24.5%) aged under 15 years, 90 (11.0%) aged 15 to 29, 405 (49.5%) aged 30 to 64, and 123 (15.0%) aged 65 or older.

Ethnicities were 92.3% European/Pākehā, 21.2% Māori, 1.5% Pacific peoples, 2.2% Asian, and 1.5% other ethnicities. People may identify with more than one ethnicity.

Although some people chose not to answer the census's question about religious affiliation, 57.9% had no religion, 31.9% were Christian, 0.4% had Māori religious beliefs, 0.4% were Hindu, 1.5% were Buddhist and 1.8% had other religions.

Of those at least 15 years old, 258 (41.7%) people had a bachelor's or higher degree, and 27 (4.4%) people had no formal qualifications. 180 people (29.1%) earned over $70,000 compared to 17.2% nationally. The employment status of those at least 15 was that 336 (54.4%) people were employed full-time, 120 (19.4%) were part-time, and 15 (2.4%) were unemployed.

Wainui-Okitu statistical area

Wainui-Okitu had a population of 1,716 at the 2018 New Zealand census, an increase of 231 people (15.6%) since the 2013 census, and an increase of 360 people (26.5%) since the 2006 census. There were 624 households, comprising 846 males and 870 females, giving a sex ratio of 0.97 males per female. The median age was 41.0 years (compared with 37.4 years nationally), with 426 people (24.8%) aged under 15 years, 180 (10.5%) aged 15 to 29, 876 (51.0%) aged 30 to 64, and 237 (13.8%) aged 65 or older.

Ethnicities were 89.3% European/Pākehā, 22.4% Māori, 1.2% Pacific peoples, 2.4% Asian, and 3.0% other ethnicities. People may identify with more than one ethnicity.

The percentage of people born overseas was 20.5, compared with 27.1% nationally.

Although some people chose not to answer the census's question about religious affiliation, 55.8% had no religion, 33.2% were Christian, 0.5% had Māori religious beliefs, 0.2% were Hindu, 0.7% were Buddhist and 2.1% had other religions.

Of those at least 15 years old, 504 (39.1%) people had a bachelor's or higher degree, and 78 (6.0%) people had no formal qualifications. The median income was $43,500, compared with $31,800 nationally. 363 people (28.1%) earned over $70,000 compared to 17.2% nationally. The employment status of those at least 15 was that 705 (54.7%) people were employed full-time, 243 (18.8%) were part-time, and 30 (2.3%) were unemployed.

Parks

Wainui Beach has two main park areas. Wainui Reserve is a sports ground. Wainui Beach and Lysnar Reserve includes the main beach, a boat ramp and boat fishing area, a dog walking area, and an area for horse riding and kite surfing.

Education
Wainui Beach School is Year 1–6 co-educational state primary school with a roll of  students as of

References

Landforms of the Gisborne District
Populated places in the Gisborne District
Beaches of New Zealand